The Express 34 is an American light displacement sailboat, designed by Carl Schumacher as a racer-cruiser and first built in 1986.

Production
The design was built by Alsberg Brothers Boatworks in Santa Cruz, California from 1986 to 1988, but is now out of production. It was the last of the production boats built before the company went out of business in 1988. The company built 28 of the boats.

Design
The Express 34 is a recreational keelboat, built predominantly of fiberglass, with wood trim. It has a masthead sloop rig, a raked stem, a reverse transom, an internally mounted elliptical spade-type rudder controlled by a tiller and an elliptical fixed fin keel. It displaces  and carries  of lead ballast.

Operational history
The Express 34 won Sailing World's Overall Boat of the Year award in 1987.

See also
List of sailing boat types

Related development
Express 37 
Express 27

Similar sailboats
Beneteau 331
Beneteau First Class 10
C&C 34
C&C 34/36
Catalina 34
Coast 34
Columbia 34
Columbia 34 Mark II
Creekmore 34
Crown 34
CS 34
Hunter 34
San Juan 34
S&S 34
Sea Sprite 34
Sun Odyssey 349
Tartan 34-2
UFO 34 (yacht)
Viking 34

References

Sailing yachts
1980s sailboat type designs
Keelboats
Sailboat type designs by Carl Schumacher
Sailboat types built by Alsberg Brothers Boatworks